Bloody Knuckles is a 2014 Canadian comedy horror film, the first feature film directed by Matt O'Mahoney. It stars Adam Boys and Kasey Ryne Mazak and received its premiere at a late-night showing at the first Other Worlds Austin festival.

Premise
Travis is an underground comics artist one of whose works depicts Chinatown boss Leonard Fong as a gangster responsible for a teenager's death by rat poison. Fong cuts off Travis's drawing hand, which rises from the sewer to take revenge and also beats up its former owner. A subplot involves Homo Dynamous, a gay man wearing leather bondage gear who comes to life from Travis' comic to assist him and his hand.

Cast 
 Adam Boys as Travis
 Kasey Ryne Mazak as Leonard Fong
 Ken Tsui as Ralphie
 Gabrielle Giraud as Amy
 Dwayne Bryshun as Homo Dynamous
 Steve Thackray as Detective Frank
 Tim Lok as Shrimp
 Jason Asuncion as Brutus
 Kent S. Leung as Static
 Robin Jung as Maggot
 Krista Magnusson as Hand
 Peter Breeze as Kyle
 Marlie Collins as Laurie

Production
The film was shot in Vancouver, and was originally titled Sick Puppy. It was O'Mahoney's feature film directing debut.

Accolades

References

External links 
 
 
 
 

Canadian comedy horror films
Canadian LGBT-related films
2014 LGBT-related films
LGBT-related comedy horror films
English-language Canadian films
2014 comedy horror films
2010s English-language films
2010s Canadian films